The Lipetsk constituency (No.114) is a Russian legislative constituency in Lipetsk Oblast. The constituency covers parts of Lipetsk and northern Lipetsk Oblast. In 1993-2007 the constituency was more compact, covering the entirety of Lipetsk and its surroundings, but during 2016 redistricting Lipetsk constituency was gerrymandered, shedding nearly half of Lipetsk to newly created Levoberezhny constituency, while taking nether rural districts and the city of Yelets from eliminated Yelets constituency.

Members elected

Election results

1993

|-
! colspan=2 style="background-color:#E9E9E9;text-align:left;vertical-align:top;" |Candidate
! style="background-color:#E9E9E9;text-align:left;vertical-align:top;" |Party
! style="background-color:#E9E9E9;text-align:right;" |Votes
! style="background-color:#E9E9E9;text-align:right;" |%
|-
|style="background-color:#E98282"|
|align=left|Tamara Chepasova
|align=left|Women of Russia
|
|19.12%
|-
|style="background-color:"|
|align=left|Viktor Minakov
|align=left|Independent
| -
|17.50%
|-
| colspan="5" style="background-color:#E9E9E9;"|
|- style="font-weight:bold"
| colspan="3" style="text-align:left;" | Total
| 
| 100%
|-
| colspan="5" style="background-color:#E9E9E9;"|
|- style="font-weight:bold"
| colspan="4" |Source:
|
|}

1995

|-
! colspan=2 style="background-color:#E9E9E9;text-align:left;vertical-align:top;" |Candidate
! style="background-color:#E9E9E9;text-align:left;vertical-align:top;" |Party
! style="background-color:#E9E9E9;text-align:right;" |Votes
! style="background-color:#E9E9E9;text-align:right;" |%
|-
|style="background-color:"|
|align=left|Viktor Minakov
|align=left|Communist Party
|
|23.75%
|-
|style="background-color:"|
|align=left|Lyudmila Kurakova
|align=left|Our Home – Russia
|
|11.72%
|-
|style="background-color:#959698"|
|align=left|Maria Sorokina
|align=left|Derzhava
|
|10.88%
|-
|style="background-color:"|
|align=left|Nikolay Puzikov
|align=left|Liberal Democratic Party
|
|7.95%
|-
|style="background-color:#DA2021"|
|align=left|Tamara Chepasova (incumbent)
|align=left|Ivan Rybkin Bloc
|
|7.70%
|-
|style="background-color:"|
|align=left|Sergey Vasilyev
|align=left|Yabloko
|
|7.50%
|-
|style="background-color:#2C299A"|
|align=left|Anatoly Kleymenov
|align=left|Congress of Russian Communities
|
|4.06%
|-
|style="background-color:#3A46CE"|
|align=left|Nikolay Ponomarev
|align=left|Democratic Choice of Russia – United Democrats
|
|3.63%
|-
|style="background-color:#1C1A0D"|
|align=left|Aleksandr Biryukov
|align=left|Forward, Russia!
|
|3.45%
|-
|style="background-color:"|
|align=left|Viktor Arzhanykh
|align=left|Independent
|
|3.34%
|-
|style="background-color:"|
|align=left|Viktor Krysanov
|align=left|Independent
|
|2.81%
|-
|style="background-color:#000000"|
|colspan=2 |against all
|
|10.30%
|-
| colspan="5" style="background-color:#E9E9E9;"|
|- style="font-weight:bold"
| colspan="3" style="text-align:left;" | Total
| 
| 100%
|-
| colspan="5" style="background-color:#E9E9E9;"|
|- style="font-weight:bold"
| colspan="4" |Source:
|
|}

1999

|-
! colspan=2 style="background-color:#E9E9E9;text-align:left;vertical-align:top;" |Candidate
! style="background-color:#E9E9E9;text-align:left;vertical-align:top;" |Party
! style="background-color:#E9E9E9;text-align:right;" |Votes
! style="background-color:#E9E9E9;text-align:right;" |%
|-
|style="background-color:"|
|align=left|Lev Yarkin
|align=left|Independent
|
|32.24%
|-
|style="background-color:"|
|align=left|Viktor Minakov (incumbent)
|align=left|Communist Party
|
|28.86%
|-
|style="background:#1042A5"| 
|align=left|Aleksandr Zaytsev
|align=left|Union of Right Forces
|
|8.78%
|-
|style="background-color:"|
|align=left|Anatoly Koltsov
|align=left|Independent
|
|6.77%
|-
|style="background-color:#FCCA19"|
|align=left|Anatoly Kleymenov
|align=left|Congress of Russian Communities-Yury Boldyrev Movement
|
|3.82%
|-
|style="background-color:"|
|align=left|Oleg Kravchenko
|align=left|Our Home – Russia
|
|3.29%
|-
|style="background-color:#084284"|
|align=left|Sergey Grishin
|align=left|Spiritual Heritage
|
|1.01%
|-
|style="background-color:#000000"|
|colspan=2 |against all
|
|13.18%
|-
| colspan="5" style="background-color:#E9E9E9;"|
|- style="font-weight:bold"
| colspan="3" style="text-align:left;" | Total
| 
| 100%
|-
| colspan="5" style="background-color:#E9E9E9;"|
|- style="font-weight:bold"
| colspan="4" |Source:
|
|}

2003

|-
! colspan=2 style="background-color:#E9E9E9;text-align:left;vertical-align:top;" |Candidate
! style="background-color:#E9E9E9;text-align:left;vertical-align:top;" |Party
! style="background-color:#E9E9E9;text-align:right;" |Votes
! style="background-color:#E9E9E9;text-align:right;" |%
|-
|style="background-color:"|
|align=left|Sergey Afendulov
|align=left|Independent
|
|29.49%
|-
|style="background-color:"|
|align=left|Viktor Minakov
|align=left|Communist Party
|
|14.07%
|-
|style="background-color:#00A1FF"|
|align=left|Igor Polosin
|align=left|Party of Russia's Rebirth-Russian Party of Life
|
|12.77%
|-
|style="background-color:"|
|align=left|Nikolay Biryukov
|align=left|Independent
|
|9.79%
|-
|style="background-color:"|
|align=left|Valentin Sviridov
|align=left|Liberal Democratic Party
|
|4.59%
|-
|style="background-color:"|
|align=left|Mikhail Kolchev
|align=left|Rodina
|
|3.96%
|-
|style="background-color:"|
|align=left|Gennady Kuptsov
|align=left|Independent
|
|2.06%
|-
|style="background-color:"|
|align=left|Sergey Kazarov
|align=left|National Patriotic Forces of Russia
|
|1.03%
|-
|style="background-color:#000000"|
|colspan=2 |against all
|
|20.13%
|-
| colspan="5" style="background-color:#E9E9E9;"|
|- style="font-weight:bold"
| colspan="3" style="text-align:left;" | Total
| 
| 100%
|-
| colspan="5" style="background-color:#E9E9E9;"|
|- style="font-weight:bold"
| colspan="4" |Source:
|
|}

2016

|-
! colspan=2 style="background-color:#E9E9E9;text-align:left;vertical-align:top;" |Candidate
! style="background-color:#E9E9E9;text-align:left;vertical-align:top;" |Party
! style="background-color:#E9E9E9;text-align:right;" |Votes
! style="background-color:#E9E9E9;text-align:right;" |%
|-
|style="background-color: " |
|align=left|Nikolay Bortsov
|align=left|United Russia
|
|54.89%
|-
|style="background-color:"|
|align=left|Nikolay Razvorotnev
|align=left|Communist Party
|
|13.07%
|-
|style="background-color:"|
|align=left|Maksim Khalimonchuk
|align=left|Liberal Democratic Party
|
|7.95%
|-
|style="background-color:"|
|align=left|Svetlana Tyunina
|align=left|A Just Russia
|
|7.02%
|-
|style="background-color:"|
|align=left|Sergey Valetov
|align=left|Rodina
|
|5.64%
|-
|style="background:"| 
|align=left|Vadim Trofimov
|align=left|Communists of Russia
|
|3.15%
|-
|style="background:"| 
|align=left|Vadim Kovrigin
|align=left|Yabloko
|
|2.11%
|-
|style="background:"| 
|align=left|Yelena Yerkina
|align=left|Party of Growth
|
|1.92%
|-
|style="background:"| 
|align=left|Vladimir Fomichev
|align=left|People's Freedom Party
|
|0.83%
|-
| colspan="5" style="background-color:#E9E9E9;"|
|- style="font-weight:bold"
| colspan="3" style="text-align:left;" | Total
| 
| 100%
|-
| colspan="5" style="background-color:#E9E9E9;"|
|- style="font-weight:bold"
| colspan="4" |Source:
|
|}

2021

|-
! colspan=2 style="background-color:#E9E9E9;text-align:left;vertical-align:top;" |Candidate
! style="background-color:#E9E9E9;text-align:left;vertical-align:top;" |Party
! style="background-color:#E9E9E9;text-align:right;" |Votes
! style="background-color:#E9E9E9;text-align:right;" |%
|-
|style="background-color: " |
|align=left|Nikolay Bortsov (incumbent)
|align=left|United Russia
|
|48.15%
|-
|style="background-color:"|
|align=left|Nikolay Bykovskikh
|align=left|Communist Party
|
|19.93%
|-
|style="background-color:"|
|align=left|Aleksandr Fomin
|align=left|A Just Russia — For Truth
|
|6.40%
|-
|style="background-color:"|
|align=left|Anatoly Yemelyanov
|align=left|Liberal Democratic Party
|
|5.79%
|-
|style="background-color: " |
|align=left|Igor Basinskikh
|align=left|New People
|
|5.68%
|-
|style="background:"| 
|align=left|Maksim Chuvashov
|align=left|Communists of Russia
|
|4.88%
|-
|style="background-color:"|
|align=left|Sergey Vasin
|align=left|The Greens
|
|2.76%
|-
|style="background-color:"|
|align=left|Zhanna Khayredinova
|align=left|Rodina
|
|1.23%
|-
| colspan="5" style="background-color:#E9E9E9;"|
|- style="font-weight:bold"
| colspan="3" style="text-align:left;" | Total
| 
| 100%
|-
| colspan="5" style="background-color:#E9E9E9;"|
|- style="font-weight:bold"
| colspan="4" |Source:
|
|}

Notes

References

Russian legislative constituencies
Politics of Lipetsk Oblast